Woody plant encroachment (also called bush encroachment, shrub encroachment, woody encroachment, bush thickening, or woody plant proliferation) is a natural phenomenon characterised by the increase in density of woody plants, bushes and shrubs, at the expense of the herbaceous layer, grasses and forbs. It predominantly occurs in grasslands, savannas and woodlands and can cause biome shifts from open grasslands and savannas to closed woodlands. The term bush encroachment refers to the expansion of native plants and not the spread of alien invasive species. It is thus defined by plant density, not species. Bush encroachment is often considered an ecological regime shift and can be a symptom of land degradation. The phenomenon is observed across different ecosystems and with different characteristics and intensities globally.

Its causes include land use intensification, such as high grazing pressure and the suppression of wildfires. Climate change is found to be an accelerating factor for woody encroachment. The impact of woody plant encroachment is highly context specific. It is often found to have severe negative consequences on key ecosystem services, especially biodiversity, animal habitat, land productivity and groundwater recharge. Across rangelands, woody encroachment has led to significant declines of productivity, threatening the livelihoods of affected land users. Various countries actively counter woody encroachment, through adapted grassland management practices, controlled fire and mechanical bush thinning.

In some cases, areas affected by woody encroachment are classified as carbon sinks and form part of national greenhouse gas inventories. The carbon sequestration effects of woody plant encroachment are however highly context specific and still insufficiently researched. Depending on rainfall, temperature and soil type, among other factors, woody plant encroachment may either increase or decrease the carbon sequestration potential of a given ecosystem. In its Sixth Assessment Report of 2022, the Intergovernmental Panel on Climate Change (IPCC) states that woody encroachment may lead to slight increases in carbon, but at the same time mask underlying land degradation processes, especially in drylands.

Ecological definition and etymology 

Woody plant encroachment is the increase in abundance of indigenous woody plants, such as shrubs and bushes, at the expense of herbaceous plants, grasses and forbs, in grasslands and shrublands. The term encroachment is thus used to describe how woody plants outcompete grasses during a given time, typically years or decades. This is in line with the meaning of the term encroachment, which is "the act of slowly covering more and more of an area". Among earliest published notions of woody plant encroachment are publications of R. Staples in 1945, O. West in 1947 and Heinrich Walter in 1954.

In some instances, woody plant encroachment is a type of secondary succession. This applies to cases of land abandonment, for example when previous agricultural land is abandoned and woody plants re-establish. However, this is distinctly different from woody plant encroachment that occurs due to global drivers, e.g. increased carbon dioxide in Earth's atmosphere, and unsustainable forms of land use intensification, such as overgrazing and fire suppression. Such drivers disrupt the ecological succession in a given grassland, specifically the balance between woody and herbaceous plants, and provide a competitive advantage to woody plants. The resulting process that leads to an abundance of woody plants is sometimes considered an ecological regime shift (also ecological state transition) that can shift drylands from grassy dominated regimes towards woody dominated savannas. An increase in spatial variance is an early indicator of such regime shift. Depending on the ecological and climatic conditions this shift can be a type of land degradation and desertification.

Although the terms are used interchangeably in some literature, woody plant encroachment is different from the spread of invasive species. As opposed to invasive species, which are deliberately or accidentally introduced species, encroacher species are indigenous to the respective ecosystem and their classification as encroachers depends on whether they outcompete other indigenous species in the same ecosystem over time. As opposed to alien plant invasion, woody plant encroachment is thus not defined by the mere presence of specific plant species, but by the ecological dynamics and changing dominance of specific species. Research into the type of woody plants that tend to become encroaching species is limited. Comparisons of encroaching and non-encroaching vachellia species found that encroaching species have a higher acquisition and competition for resources. Their canopy architecture is different and only encroaching tree species reduce the productivity of perennial vegetation.

By definition, woody plant encroachment occurs in grasslands. It is thus distinctly different from reforestation and afforestation. However, there is a strong overlap between vegetation greening, as detected through satellite-derived vegetation indices, and woody plant encroachment.

Grasslands and forests, as well as grasslands and shrublands, can be alternative stable states of ecosystems, but empirical evidence of such bistability is still limited.

Causes 
Woody encroachment is assumed to have its origins at the beginning of Holocene and the start of warming, with tropical species expanding their ranges away from the equator into more temperate regions. But it has occurred at unparalleled rates since the mid-19th century. As such, it is classified as a type of grassland degradation, which occurs through direct and indirect human impact during the Anthropocene.

Various factors have been found to contribute to the process of woody plant encroachment. Both land use practices as well as global drivers can be drivers of woody plant encroachment. Due to its strong link to human induced causes, woody plant encroachment has been termed a social-ecological regime shift. 

The causes of woody encroachment differ significantly between wet and dry savanna.

Land use 
Where land is abandoned, the rapid spread of native bush plants is often observed. This is for example the case in former forest areas in the Alps that had been converted to agricultural land and later abandoned. In Southern Europe encroachment is thus linked to rural exodus. In such instances, land use intensification, e.g. increased grazing pressure, is found to be effective against woody encroachment. More recently, it is observed that land use cessation is not the only driver of woody encroachment in aforement regions, since the phenomenon occurs also where land continued to be used for agricultural purposes.

But also land use intensification itself can be the cause of woody plant encroachment, especially in the following forms:

 Overgrazing: In the context of land intensification, a frequently cited cause of woody plant encroachment is overgrazing, commonly a result of overstocking and fencing of farms, as well as the lack of animal rotation and land resting periods. Overgrazing plays an especially strong role in mesic grasslands, where bushes can expand easily when gaining a competitive advantage over grasses, while woody encroachment is less predictable in xeric shrublands. Seed dispersal through animals is found to be a contributing factor to woody encroachment. While overgrazing has in the past frequently been found to be a main driver of woody encroachment, it is observed that woody encroachment continues in the respective areas even after grazing reduced or even ceases.
 Absence of large mammals: linked to the introduction of rangeland agriculture as well as unsustainable hunting practices, the reduction of large mammals such as elephant and rhino are a contributing factor to woody encroachment.
 Fire suppression: A connected cause for woody plant encroachment is the reduction in the frequency of wildfires that would occur naturally, but are suppressed in frequency and intensity by land owners due to the associated risks. When the lack of fire reduces tree mortality and consequently the grass fuel load for fire decreases, a negative feedback loop occurs. It has been estimated that from a threshold of 40% canopy cover, surface grass fires are rare. At intermediate rainfall, fire can be the main determinant between the development of savannas and forests. In experiments in the United States it was determined that annual fires lead to the maintenance of grasslands, 4-year burn intervals lead to the establishment of shrubby habitats and 20-year burn intervals lead to severe woody plant encroachment. Moreover, the reduction of browsing by herbivores, e.g. when natural habitats are transformed into agricultural land, fosters woody plant encroachment, as bushes grow undisturbed and with increasing size also become less susceptible to fire. Already one decade of land management change, such as the exclusion of fires and overgrazing, can lead to severe woody plant encroachment. The global increase in atmospheric CO2 contributes to the reduction of wildfires, as it decreases flammability of grass.
 Competition for water: Another positive feedback loop occurs when encroaching woody species reduce the plant available water, providing a disadvantage for grasses, promoting further woody encroachment. According to the two-layer theory, grasses use topsoil moisture, while woody plants predominantly use subsoil moisture. If grasses are reduced by overgrazing, this reduces their water intake and allows more water to penetrate into the subsoil for the use by woody plants. Moreover, research suggests that bush roots are less vulnerable to water stress than grass roots during droughts. Drought, in combination with high levels of grazing pressure, can function as the tipping point for an ecosystem, causing woody encroachment.
 Population pressure: population pressure can be the cause for woody plant encroachment, when large trees are cut as building material or fuel. This stimulates coppice growth and results in shrubbiness of the vegetation.

Global drivers 
While changes in land management are often seen as the main driver of woody encroachment, some studies suggest that global drivers increase woody vegetation regardless of land management practices.

 Rainfall patterns: a frequently cited theory is the state-and-transition model. This model outlines how rainfall and its variability is the key driver of vegetation growth and its composition, bringing about woody plant encroachment under certain rainfall patterns. For example, if rainfall intensity increases, deep soil water typically increases, which in turn benefits bushes more than grasses.
 Climate change: climate change has been found to be a cause or accelerating factor for woody plant encroachment. This is because increased atmospheric CO2 concentrations fosters the growth of woody plants. Woody plants with C3 photosynthetic pathway thrive under high CO2 concentrations, as opposed to grasses with C4 photosynthetic pathway. Also tolerance to herbivory is found to be enhanced during the plants' recruitment stage under increased CO2 concentrations. Also linked to climate change, changes in precipitation can foster woody encroachment. Increased precipitation can foster the establishment, growth and density of woody plants. Also decreased precipitation can promote woody plant encroachment, as it fosters the shift from mesophytic grasses to xerophytic shrubs. Woody encroachment correlates to warming in the tundra, while it is linked to increased rainfall in the savanna. Species such as Vachelllia sieberiana thrive under warming irrespective of the competition with grasses. A representative sampling of South African grasslands, woody plant encroachment was found to be the same under different land uses and different rainfall amounts, suggesting that climate change may be the primary driver of the encroachment. The Intergovernmental Panel on Climate Change (IPCC) in its report "Global warming of 1.5°C" states that high-latitude tundra and boreal forests are at particular risk of climate change-induced degradation, with a high likelihood of shrub encroachment under continued warming.
Once established, shrubs suppress grass growth, perpetuating woody plant encroachment.

Impact on ecosystem services 
Woody encroachment constitutes a shift in plant composition with far-reaching impact on the affected ecosystems. While it is commonly identified as a form of land degradation, with severe negative consequences for various ecosystem services, such as biodiversity, groundwater recharge, carbon storage capacity and herbivore carrying capacity, this link is not universal. Impacts are dependent on species, scale and environmental context factors and shrub encroachment can have significant positive impacts on ecosystem services as well. While woody plant encroachment is not generally synonymous with degradation, it is found to contribute to degradation of arid ecosystems. There is a need for ecosystem-specific assessments and responses to woody encroachment.

Generally, the following context factors determine the ecological impact of woody encroachment:

 Prevailing land use: while positive ecological effects can occur in unmanaged landscapes or certain land-uses, negative ecological effects are observed especially in landscapes used for livestock grazing.
 Density of woody plants: Plant diversity and ecosystem multifunctionality typically peaks at intermediate levels of woody cover and high woody covers generally have negative impacts.
 Environmental conditions: arid environments show more negative responses to woody encroachment.

Woody encroachment is often seen as a form of land degradation and an expression of desertification. Due to its ambiguous role of contributing to greening and desertification, it has been termed "green desertification". However, the link to desertification is not universal. During woody encroachment the herbaceous cover in the inter-canopy zones typically remains intact, while during desertification these zones degrade and turn into bare soil devoid of organic matter. For example, in the Mediterranean region shrub establishment can contribute to the reversal of ongoing desertification.

Biodiversity 
Bush expands at the direct expense of other plant species, potentially reducing plant diversity and animal habitats. These effects are context specific, a meta-analysis of 43 publications of the time period 1978 to 2016 found that woody plant encroachment has distinct negative effects on species richness and total abundance in Africa, especially on mammals and herpetofauna, but positive effects in North America. However, in context specific analyses also in Northern America negative effects are observed. For example, piñon-juniper encroachment threatens up to 350 sagebrush-associated plant and animal species in the USA. A study of 30 years of woody encroachment in Brazil found a significant decline of species richness by 27%. Shrub encroachment may result in increase vertebrate species abundance and richness. However, these encroached habitats and their species assemblages may become more sensitive to droughts.

Evidence of biodiversity losses include the following:

 Grasses: Studies in South Africa have found that grass richness reduces by more than 50% under intense woody plant encroachment. In North America, a meta-analysis of 29 studies from 13 different grassland communities found that species richness declined by an average of 45% under woody plant encroachment. Rare species and those with lower stature, are at risk of going extinct. Among the severely affected flora is the small white lady's slipper. Generally, large bushes are found to coexist with the herbaceous layer, while smaller shrubs compete with it. 
 Mammals: woody plant encroachment has a significant impact on herbivore assemblage structure and can lead to the displacement of herbivores and other mammal types that prefer open areas. Among other factors, predation sucess of various mammals is negatively impacted by bush encroachment. Among the species found to lose habitat in areas affected by woody plant encroachment are cats such as cheetah, white-footed fox, as well as antelopes such as the Common tsessebe, Hirola and plains zebra. In Latin America the habitat of the almost extinct Guanaco is threatened by woody encroachment. In some rangelands, woody plant encroachment is associated with a decline in wildlife grazing capacity of up to 80%. Among rodent species, those specialists on grasslands typically decline in abundance under woody encroachment, while those specialised on forests might increase in abundance.
 Birds: the impact of woody encroachment on bird species must be differentiated between shrub-associated species and grassland specialists. Studies find that shrub-associated species benefit from woody encroachment up to a certain threshold of woody cover (e.g. 22 percent in a study conducted in North America), while grassland specialist populations decline. Experiments in Namibia have shown that foraging birds, such as the endangered Cape vulture, avoid encroachment levels above 2,600 woody plants per hectare. In North American grasslands, bird population decline as a result of woody encroachment has been identified as a critical conservation concern. Amongst the birds negatively affected by woody plant encroachment are the Secretarybird, Grey go-away-bird, Marico sunbird, lesser prairie chicken, Greater Sage-Grouse, Archer's lark, Northern bobwhite and the Kori bustard.
Insects: woody plant encroachment is linked to species loss or reduction in species richness of insects with preference for open habitats. Affected species include butterfly and ant.

Groundwater recharge and soil moisture 

Woody plant encroachment is frequently linked to reduced groundwater recharge, based on evidence that bushes consume significantly more rainwater than grasses and encroachment alters water streamflow. The downward movement of water is hindered by increased root density and depth. Woody encroachment generally leads to root elongation in the soil. The impact on groundwater recharge differs between sandstone bedrocks and karst regions as well as between deep and shallow soils. 

While water loss is common in closed canopy woodlands (i.e. subhumid conditions with increased evapotranspiration) in semiarid and arid ecosystems recharge can also improve under encroachment, provided there is good ecohydrological connectivity of the respective landscape.

Although this is strongly context dependent, bush control can be an effective method for the improvement of groundwater recharge. Applied research, assessing the water availability after brush removal, was conducted in Texas USA, showing an increase in water availability in all cases. Studies in the United States moreover find that dense encroachment with Juniperus virginiana is capable of transpiring nearly all rainfall, thus altering groundwater recharge significantly. An exception is shrub encroachment on slopes, where groundwater recharge can increase under encroachment. Further studies in the USA indicate that also stream flow is significantly hamperd by woody plant encroachment, with the associated risk of higher pollutant concentrations.

While there is general consensus that woody plant encroachment has an ecohydrological impact, concrete experience with changes in groundwater recharge is however largely based on anecdotal evidence or regionally and temporally limited research projects. Moreover, there is limited understanding how hydrological cycles through woody encroachment affect carbon influx and efflux, with both carbon gains and losses possible.

Besides groundwater recharge, woody encroachment increases tree transpiration and evaporation of soil moisture, due to increased canopy cover.

Carbon sequestration 
Against the background of global efforts to mitigate climate change, the carbon sequestration and storage capacity of natural ecosystems receives increasing attention. Grasslands constitute 40% of Earth's natural vegetation and hold a considerable amount of the global Soil Organic Carbon. Shifts in plant species composition and ecosystem structure, especially through woody encroachment, lead to significant uncertainty in predicting carbon cycling in grasslands. The impact of bush control on the carbon sequestration and storage capacity of the respective ecosystems is an important management consideration.

Research on the changes to carbon sequestration under woody plant encroachment and bush control is still insufficient. The Intergovernmental Panel on Climate Change (IPCC) states that woody plant encroachment generally leads to increased aboveground woody carbon, while below-ground carbon changes depend on annual rainfall and soil type. The IPCC points out that carbon stock changes under bush encroachment have been studied in Australia, Southern Africa and North America,but no global assessment has been done yet. 

Factors relevant for comparisons of carbon sequestration potentials between encroached and non-encroached grasslands, include the following: above-ground net primary production (ANPP), below-ground net primary production (BNPP), photosynthesis rates, plant respiration rates, plant litter decomposition rates, soil microbacterial activity.

 Above-ground carbon: woody plant encroachment implies an increase in woody plants, in most cases at the expense of grasses. Considering that woody plants have a longer lifespan and generally also more mass, woody plant encroachment can imply an increase in above-ground carbon storage through biosequestration. Studies however find that this is depending on climatic conditions, with aboveground carbon pools decreasing under woody encroachment where mean annual precipitation is less than 330mm and increasing where precipitation is higher. A contributing factor is that woody encroachment decreases above-ground plant primary production in mesic ecosystems.
 Below-ground carbon: globally, the soil organic carbon pool is twice as large as the plant carbon pool, making its quantification essential. Soil organic carbon makes out two-thirds of soil carbon. Comparisons of grasslands, shrublands and forests show that forest and shrubland hold more above-ground carbon, while grasslands boast more soil carbon. Generally, herbaceous plants allocate more biomass below-ground than woody plants.

The impact of woody encroachment on soil organic carbon is found to be dependent on rainfall, with soil organic carbon increasing in dry ecosystems and decreasing in mesic ecosystems under encroachment. In wet environments, grasslands have more soil carbon than shrublands and woodlands. Under shrub encroachment, the losses in soil carbon can be sufficient to offset the gains of above-ground carbon gains. Degradation of grasslands has in some areas led to the loss of up to 40% of the ecosystem's soil organic carbon. An important factor is that under woody plant encroachment the increased photosynthetic potential is largely offset by increased plant respiration and respective carbon losses. In tropical savanna soils, most soil organic carbon is derived from grass, not woody plants.
Soil organic carbon changes need to be viewed at landscape level, as there are differences between under canopy and inter canopy processes. When a landscape becomes increasingly encroached and the remaining open grassland patches are overgrazed as a result, soil organic carbon may decrease. In South Africa, woody plant encroachment was found to slow decomposition rates of litter, which took twice the time to decay under woody plant encroachment compared to open savannas. This suggests a significant impact of woody encroachment on the soil organic carbon balance. In pastoral lands of Ethiopia, woody plant encroachment was found to have little to now positive effect on soil organic carbon and woody encroachment restriction was the most effective way to maintain soil organic carbon. In the United States, substantial soil organic carbon sequestration was observed in deeper portions of the soil, following woody encroachment.
A meta-analysis of 142 studies found that shrub encroachment alters soil organic carbon (0–50 cm), with changes ranging between -50 and 300 percent. Soil organic carbon increased under the following conditions: semi-arid and humid regions, encroachment by leguminous shrubs as opposed to non-legumes, sandy soils as opposed to clay soils. The study further concludes that shrub encroachment has a mainly positive effect on top-soil organic carbon content, with significant variations among climate, soil and shrub types. There is a lack of standardised methodologies to assess the effect of woody encroachment on soil organic carbon.

 Total ecosystem carbon: When loosely equating woody plant encroachment with afforestation, considering above-ground biomass alone, encroachment can be seen as a carbon sink. However, considering the losses in the herbaceous layer as well as changes in soil organic carbon, the quantification of terrestrial carbon pools and fluxes becomes more complex and context specific. Changes to carbon sequestration and storage need to be determined for each respective ecosystem and holistically, i.e. considering both above-ground and below-ground carbon storage. Generally, elevated CO2 leads to increased woody growth, which implies that the woody plants increase their uptake of nutrients from the soil, reducing the soil's capacity to store carbon. In contrast, grasses increase little biomass above-ground, but contribute significantly to below-ground carbon sequestration. It is found that above-ground carbon gains might be completely offset by below-ground carbon losses during encroachment. Significant carbon losses occur through increased fluvial erosion and importantly this includes previously stabilised organic carbon from legacy grasslands. Some studies find that carbon sequestration can increase for a number of years under woody encroachment, while the magnitude of this increase is highly dependent on annual rainfall. It is found that woody encroachment has little impact on sequestration potential in dry areas with less than 400mm in precipitation. Moreover, encroached ecosystems are more likely than open grasslands to lose carbon during droughts. It is generally observed that carbon increases overall in wetter ecosystems under encroachment and can reduce in arid ecosystems under encroachment. This implies that the positive carbon effect of woody plant encroachment may decrease with progressing climate change, particularly in ecosystems that are forecasted to experience decreased precipitation and increased temperature. Among the ecosystems expected to lose carbon storage under woody encroachment is the tundra.

Land productivity 
Woody plant encroachment directly impacts land productivity, as widely documented in the context of animal carrying capacity.

In the western United States, 25% of rangelands experience sustained tree cover expansion, with estimated losses for agricultural producers of $5 billion since 1990. The forage lost annually is estimated to be equal to the consumption of 1.5 million bison or 1.9 million cattle. In Northern America, each 1 percent of increase in woody cover implies a reduction of 0.6 to 1.6 cattle per 100 hectares. In the Southern African country Namibia it is assumed that agricultural carrying capacity of rangelands has declined by two-thirds due to woody plant encroachment. In East Africa there is evidence that an increase of bush cover of 10 percent reduced grazing by 7 percent, with land becoming unusable as rangeland when the bush cover reaches 90 percent.

Also touristic potential of land is found to decline in areas with heavy woody plant encroachment, with visitors shifting to less encroached areas and better visibility of wildlife.

Rural livelihoods 
While the ecological effects of woody encroachment are multifold and vary depending on encroachment density and context factors, woody encroachment is often considered to have a negative impact on rural livelihoods. In Africa 21% of the population depend on rangeland resources. Woody encroachment typically leads to an increase in less palatable woody species at the expense of palatable grasses. This reduces the resources available to pastoral communities and rangeland based agriculture at large. Woody encroachment has negative consequences on livelihoods especially arid areas, which support a third of the world population's livelihoods. Woody plant encroachment is expected to lead to large scale biome changes in Africa and experts argue that climate change adaptation strategies need to be flexible in order to adjust to this process.

Others 
In the United States, woody encroachment has been linked to the spread of tick-borne pathogens and respective disease risk for humans and animals. In the Arctic tundra, shrub encroachment can reduce cloudiness and contribute to a raise in temperature. In Northern America, significant increases in temperature and rainfall were linked to woody encroachment, amounting to values up to 214mm and 0.68 °C respectively. This is caused by a decrease in surface albedo.

Targeted bush control in combination with the protection of larger trees is found to improve scavenging that regulates disease processes, alters species distributions, and influences nutrient cycling.

Studies of woody plant encroachment in the Brazilian savanna suggest that encroachment renders affected ecosystems more vulnerable to climate change.

Quantification and monitoring 
There is no static definition of what is considered woody encroachment, especially when encroachment of indigenous plants occurs. While it is simple to determine vegetation trends (e.g. an increase in woody plants over time), it is more complex to determine thresholds beyond which an area is to be considered as encroached. Various definitions as well as quantification and mapping methods have been developed.

In Southern Africa, the BECVOL method (Biomass Estimates from Canopy Volume) finds frequent application. It determines Evapotranspiration Tree Equivalents (ETTE) per selected area. This data is used for comparison against climatic factors, especially annual rainfall, to determine whether the respective area has a higher number of woody plants than is considered sustainable.

Remote sensing imagery is frequently used to determine the extent of woody encroachment. Shortcomings of this methodology include difficulties to distinguish species and the inability to detect small shrubs. Moreover, UAV (drone) based multispectral data and Lidar data are frequently used to quantify woody encroachment. The combination of colour-infrared aerial imagery and support-vector machines classification, can lead to high accuracy in identifying shrubs.

The probability of woody plant encroachment for the African continent has been mapped using GIS data and the variables precipitation, soil moisture and cattle density. An exclusive reliance on remote sensing data bears the risk of wrongly interpreting woody plant encroachment, e.g. as beneficial vegetation greening. Google Earth images have been successfully used to analyse woody encroachment in South Africa.

Rephotography is found to be an effective tool for the monitoring of vegetation change, including woody encroachment and forms the basis of various encroachment assessments.

In most affected ecosystems, knowledge of historical land cover is limited to the availability of photographic evidence or written records. Methods to overcome this knowledge gap include the assessment of pollen records. In a recent application, vegetation cover of the past 130 years in a woody plant encroachment area in Namibia was established.

Restoration 

Bush control is the active management of the density of woody species in grasslands. Although woody encroachment in many instances is a direct consequence of unsustainable management practices, it is unlikely that the introduction of more sustainable practices alone (e.g. the management of fire and grazing regimes) will achieve to restore already degraded areas. Encroached grasslands can constitute a stable state, meaning that without intervention the vegetation will not return to its previous composition. Responsive measures, such as mechanical removal, are needed to restore a different balance between woody and herbaceous plants. Once a high woody plant density is established, woody plants contribute to the soil seed bank more than grasses and the lack of grasses presents less fuel for fires, reducing their intensity. This perpetuates woody encroachment and necessitates intervention, if the encroached state is undesirable for the functions and use of the respective ecosystems. Most interventions constitute a selective thinning of bush densities, although in some contexts also repeat clear-cutting has shown to effectively restore diversity of typical savanna species. In decision making on which woody species to thin out and which to retain, structural and functional traits of the species play a key role. The restoration of degraded grasslands can bring about a wide range of ecosystem service improvements. It can therewith also strengthen the drought resilience of affected ecosystems. Bush control can lead to biodiversity improvements regardless of the predominant land use.

State and Transition Models have been developed in order to provide management support to land users, capturing ecosystem complexities beyond succession, but their applicability is still limited.

Types of interventions 
The term bush control, or brush management, refers to actions that are targeted at controlling the density and composition of bushes and shrubs in a given area. Such measures either serve to reduce risks associated with woody plant encroachment, such as wildfires, or to rehabilitate the affected ecosystems. It is widely accepted that encroaching indigenous woody plants are to be reduced in numbers, but not eradicated. This is critical as these plants provide important functions in the respective ecosystems, e.g. they serve as habitat for animals. Efforts to counter woody plant encroachment fall into the scientific field of restoration ecology and are primarily guided by ecological parameters, followed by economic indicators. Three different categories of measures can be distinguished:

 Preventive measures: application of proven good management practices to prevent the excessive growth of woody species, e.g. through appropriate stocking rates and rotational grazing in the case of rangeland agriculture. It is generally assumed that preventative measures are a more cost-effective method to combat woody encroachment than treating ecosystems once degradation has occurred. Certain land uses and animal species can aid in preventing woody plant encroachment, for example elephants.
Responsive measures: the reduction of bush densities through targeted bush harvesting or other forms of removal (bush thinning).
 Maintenance measures: repeated or continuous measures of maintaining the bush density and composition that has been established through bush thinning.

Control methods

Natural bush control 
The administration of controlled fires is a commonly applied method of bush control. In a cross-continental collaboration between South Africa and the US, a synthesis on the experience with fire as a bush control method was published. Fire was found to be especially effective in reducing bush densities, when coupled with the natural event of droughts or the intentional introduction of browsers. Fires have the advantage that they consume the seeds of woody plants in the grass layer before germination, therefore reducing the grasslands sensitivity to encroachment. Prerequisite for successful bush control through fire is sufficient fuel load, thus fires have a higher effectiveness in areas where sufficient grass is available. Furthermore, fires must be administered regularly to address re-growth. Bush control through fire is found to be more effective when applying a range of fire intensities over time. The relation between prescribed fire and tree mortality, is subject of ongoing research. The success rate of prescribed fires differs depending on the season during which it is applied. In some cases, fire treatment slows down woody encroachment, but is unsuccessful in reversing it. Long-term research in the South African savanna found that high-intensity fire did reduce encroachment in the short-term, but not in the mid-term. Optimal fire management may vary depending on vegetation community, land use as well as frequency and timing of fires. Controlled fires are not only a tool to manage biodiversity, but can also be used to reduce GHG emissions by shifting fire seasonality and reducing fire intensity.

Rewilding ecosystems with historic herbivores can further contribute to bush control. 

Variable livestock grazing can be used to reduce woody encroachment as well as re-growth after bush thinning. A well documented approach is the introduction of larger herds of goats that feed on the wood plants and thereby limiting their growth. There is evidence that some rural farming communities have used small ruminants, like goats, to prevent woody plant encroachment for decades. Overall, the role of targeted grazing systems as biodiversity conservation tool is subject of ongoing research.

Chemical bush control 
Wood densities are frequently controlled through the application of herbicides, in particular arboricides. Frequently applied herbicides are based on the active ingredients tebuthiuron, ethidimuron, bromacil and picloram.  In East Africa, first comprehensive experiments on the effectiveness of such bush control date back to 1958–1960. There is however evidence that applied chemicals can have negative long-term effects and effectively prevent the recruitment of desired grasses and other plants. The application of non-species-specific herbicides is found to result in lower species richness than the application of species-specific herbicides. Scientific trials in South Africa showed that the application of herbicides has the highest success rate when coupled with mechanical bush thinning.

Mechanical bush control 

Cutting or harvesting of bushes and shrubs with manual or mechanised equipment. Mechanical cutting of woody plants is followed by stem-burning, fire or browsing to suppress re-growth. Some studies find that mechanical bush control is more sustainable than controlled fires, because burning leads to deeper soil degradation and faster recovering of shrubs. Bush that is mechanically harvested is often burnt on piles, but can also serve as feedstock for value addition, including firewood, charcoal, energy and construction material. Mechanical cutting is found to be effective, but requires repeat application. When woody branches are left to cover the degraded soil, this method is called brush packing.

Economics 
As woody encroachment is often widespread and most rehabilitation efforts costly, funding is a key constraint. In the case of mechanical woody plant thinning, i.e. the selective harvesting, the income from downstream value chains can fund the restoration activities. 

An example of highly commercialised encroacher biomass utilisation is charcoal production in Namibia. There are also efforts to utilise encroaching woody species as source of alternative animal fodder. This involves either making use of the leaf material of encroaching species, or milling the entire plant.

In the same vein, the World Wildlife Fund has identified invasive and encroaching plant species as a possible feed stock for Sustainable Aviation Fuel in South Africa.

Also Payment for Ecosystem Services and specifically Carbon Credits are increasingly explored as a funding mechanism for the control of woody encroachment. Savanna fire management is found to have potential to generate carbon revenue, with which rangeland restoration in Africa can be funded.

Challenges 
Literature emphasises that a restoration of woody plant encroachment areas to a desired previous non-encroached state is difficult to achieve and the recovery of key-ecosystem may be short-lived or not occur. Intervention methods and technologies must be context specific to achieve their intended outcome. Current efforts of selective plant removal are found to have slowed or halted woody encroachment in respective areas, but are sometimes found to be outpaced by continuing encroachment.

When bush thinning is implemented in isolation, without follow-up measures, grassland may not be rehabilitated. This is because such once-off treatments typically target small areas at a time and they leave plant seeds behind enabling rapid re-establishment of bushes. A combination of preventative measures, addressing the causes of woody plant encroachment, and responsive measures, rehabilitating affected ecosystems, can overcome woody plant encroachment in the long-run.

In grassland conservation efforts, the implementation of measures across networks of private lands, instead of individual farms, remains a key challenge. Due to the high cost of chemical or mechanical removal of woody species, such interventions are often implemented on a small scale, i.e. a few hectares at a time. This differs from natural control processes before human land use, e.g. widespread fires and vegetation pressure by free roaming wildlife. As a result, the interventions often have limited impact on the continued dispersal and spread of woody plants.

Countering woody encroachment can be costly and largely depends on the financial capacity of land users. Linking bush control to the concept of Payment for ecosystem services (PES) has been explored in some countries.

Relation to climate change mitigation and adaptation

Consideration in GHG inventories 
Detailed accounting for the effect of woody encroachment on global carbon pools and fluxes is unclear. Given scientific uncertainties, it varies widely how countries factor woody encroachment and the control thereof into their national Greenhouse Gas Inventories. In early carbon sink quantifications, woody encroachment was found to account for as much as 22% to 40% of the regional carbon sink in the USA. In the US, woody encroachment is however seen as a key uncertainty in the US carbon balance and the sink capacity is found to decrease when encroachment has reached its maximum extent. Also in Australia, woody encroachment constitutes a high proportion of the national carbon account. In South Africa, woody encroachment was estimated to have added around 21.000 Gg CO2 to the national carbon sink, while it has been highlighted that especially the loss of grass roots leads to losses of below-ground carbon, which is not fully compensated by gains of above-ground carbon.

It is suggested that the classification of encroached grasslands and savannas as carbon sinks may often be incorrect, underestimating soil organic carbon losses. Beyond difficulties to conclusively quantify the changes in carbon storage, promoting carbon storage through woody encroachment can constitute a trade-off, as it may reduce biodiversity of savanna endemics and core ecosystem services, like land productivity and water availability.

Grassland conservation can make a significant contribution to global carbon sequestration targets, but compared to sequestration potential in forestry and agriculture, this is still insufficiently explored and implemented.

Bush Control as adaptation measure 
Some countries, for example South Africa, acknowledge inconclusive evidence on the emissions effect of bush thinning, but strongly promote it as a means of climate change adaptation. Geographic selection of intervention areas, targeting areas that are at an early stage of encroachment, can minimise above-ground carbon losses and therewith minimise the possible trade-off between mitigation and adaptation. The Intergovernmental Panel on Climate Change (IPCC) reflects on this trade-off: "This variable relationship between the level of encroachment, carbon stocks, biodiversity, provision of water and pastoral value can present a conundrum to policymakers, especially when considering the goals of three Rio Conventions: UNFCCC, UNCCD and UNCBD. Clearing intense woody plant encroachment may improve species diversity, rangeland productivity, the provision of water and decrease desertification, thereby contributing to the goals of the UNCBD and UNCCD as well as the adaptation aims of the UNFCCC. However, it would lead to the release of biomass carbon stocks into the atmosphere and potentially conflict with the mitigation aims of the UNFCCC." The IPPC further lists bush control as relevant measure under ecosystem-based adaptation and community-based adaptation.

In its 2022 Sixth Assessment Report, the Intergovernmental Panel on Climate Change (IPCC) identifies woody encroachment as a contribution to land degradation, through the loss of open ecosystems and their services. The report further stipulates that while there may be slight increases in carbon, woody encroachment at the same time masks negative impacts on biodiversity and water cycles and therewith livelihoods.

Grassland conservation versus afforestation 
With afforestation having gained popularity as a measure to create or enhance carbon sinks and thereby mitigate global climate change, there are calls to more carefully select suitable ecosystems. Conservation efforts increasingly target grasslands, savannas and open-canopy woodlands, recognising their importance for biodiversity and ecosystem services. Accepting woody encroachment or the invasion of alien woody species as a measure to mitigate climate change, can have severe negative consequences for the respective ecosystems. It is found that grasslands are frequently misidentified as degraded forests and targeted by afforestation efforts. According to an analysis of areas identified to have forest restoration potential by the World Resources Institute, this includes up to 900 million hectares grasslands. In Africa alone, 100 million hectares of grasslands are found to be at risk by misdirected afforestation efforts. Among the areas mapped as degraded forests are the Serengeti and Kruger National Parks, which have not been forested for several million years. The Intergovernmental Panel on Climate Change (IPCC) states that mitigation action, such as reforestation or afforestation, can encroach on land needed for agricultural adaptation and therewith threaten food security, livelihoods and ecosystem functions.

Global extent 

Woody encroachment occurs on all continents in a variety of ecosystems. Its causes, extent and response measures differ and are highly context specific. Ecosystems affected by woody encroachment include closed shrublands, open shrublands, woody savannas, savannas, and grasslands. It can occur not only in tropical and subtropical climates, but also in temperate areas. Woody encroachment occurs at 1 percent per decade in the Eurasian steppes, 10-20 percent in North America, 8 percent in South America, 2.4 percent in Africa and 1 percent in Australia.

In Sub-Saharan Africa, woody vegetation cover has increased by 8% during the past three decades, mainly through woody plant encroachment. Overall, 750 million hectares of non-forest biomes experienced significant net gains in woody plant cover, which is more than three times the area that experienced net losses of woody vegetation. In around 249 million hectares of African rangelands, long-term climate change was found to be the key driver of vegetation change. In Southern Africa, woody encroachment has been identified as the main factor of greening, i.e. of the increase in vegetation cover detected through remote sensing.

In Southern Europe an estimated 8 percent of land area has transitioned from grazing land to woody vegetation between 1950 and 2010.

In the Eurasian Steppe, the largest grassland globally, climate change linked woody plant encroachment has been found to occur at around 1% per decade.

In the Arctic Tundra, shrub plant cover has increased by 20 percent during the past 50 years. During the same time period, shrub and tree cover increased by 30 percent in the savannas of Latin America, Africa and Australia.

See also 

 Convention on Biological Diversity 
 Effects of climate change on plant biodiversity
 Environmental restoration
 Farmer-managed natural regeneration
 Grassland degradation
 Land rehabilitation
 Land restoration
 Rangeland management
 United Nations Convention to Combat Desertification

References

Sources 

 IPCC - Cross-Chapter Paper 3: Deserts, Semiarid Areas and Desertification. In: Climate Change 2022: Impacts, Adaptation and Vulnerability (2022)
 IPCC Special Report – Climate Change and Land – Climate change, desertification, land degradation, sustainable land management, food security, and greenhouse gas fluxes in terrestrial ecosystems (2019)
 De Klerk, J. N. (2004) Bush Encroachment in Namibia
 Department of Environmental Affairs (2019) Towards a Policy on Indigenous Bush Encroachment in South Africa
 Brush management as a rangeland conservation strategy: A critical evaluation, U.S. Department of Agriculture (2011)
 Eldridge, J. David et al. (2011) Impacts of shrub encroachment on ecosystem structure and functioning: towards a global synthesis
Archer, Steven (2017) Woody Plant Encroachment: Causes and Consequences. In: Briske D. (eds) Rangeland Systems
 Brush management: past, present, future (2004), Texas A & M University Press
 Twidwell, Dirac; Fogarty, Dillon T. (2021). "A guide to reducing risk and vulnerability to woody encroachment in rangelands" (PDF). University of Nebraska-Lincoln.
 Stanton RA, Boone WW, Soto-Shoender J, Fletcher RJ, Blaum N, McCleery RA. Shrub encroachment and vertebrate diversity: A global meta-analysis. Global Ecology and Biogeography. March 2018; 27(3):368–79.

External links

Websites 

 The Rangelands Partnership – Global Rangelands Portal
 Wrangle – World Rangeland Learning Experience
 De-bushing Advisory Service
Stockholm Resilience Centre – Regime Shifts DataBase: Bush Encroachment

Articles 

Rural 21 Magazine – Namibia's bush business

Agricultural land
Biodiversity
Ecosystems
Environmental issues
Ecological restoration
Environment of Namibia
Environment of South Africa
Global environmental issues
Grasslands
Human impact on the environment
Land management
Land use
Tropical and subtropical grasslands, savannas, and shrublands
Temperate grasslands, savannas, and shrublands